Tendron is a commune in the Cher department in the Centre-Val de Loire region of France.

Geography
The river Airain flows southwest through the northwestern part of the commune.

Population

Places of interest
 The eighteenth-century chateau of Fontenay.

See also
Communes of the Cher department

References

External links

Tendron on the Annuaire Mairie website 

Communes of Cher (department)